Chokher Bali is a Bengali television serial which aired on the Bengali general entertainment channel Zee Bangla.

Synopsis
Set in the early twentieth century, the story revolves around the lives of Mahendra, Ashalata, Binodini and Behari. Binodini, a beautiful young widow happened to stay with a newlywed couple, Mahendra and Ashalata. The beauty and charm of Binodini soon enchants Mahendra towards her. But as time progresses, Binodini gets drawn towards Mahendra's friend, the idealist Behari. How Binodini becomes the Chokher Bali for Ashalata forms the trajectory of the story. The story, carved beautifully by Tagore, is a reflection of man-woman relationship and much more.

Cast
Rezwan Rabbani Sheikh as Bihari
Rohit Samanta as Mahendra
Sudipta Roy as Ashalata
Tania Ganguly as Binodini
Nandini Ghoshal / Chaitali Mukhopadhyay as Rajlaxmi
Kaushiki Guha as Annapurna
Neel Mukherjee as Bipin
Shyamoupti Mudly as Sarju
Rumpa Chatterjee as Choto Kakima
Ritoja Majumder as Binodini's Aunt
Animesh Bhaduri as Phulu
Nibedita Biswas as Jamuna
Sujoy Saha as Somu

References

External links
 Official website at ZEE5

2015 Indian television series debuts
Zee Bangla original programming
2016 Indian television series endings